Antonia Cósmica Orellana Guarello (born 21 December 1989) is a Chilean politician, journalist and  Minister of Women and Gender Equality.

References

External links
 

1989 births
Living people
University of Chile alumni
21st-century Chilean politicians
Social Convergence politicians
Women government ministers of Chile
Ministers of Women and Gender Equality of Chile